Louise Elizabeth Manny (1890 – 17 August 1970) was a New Brunswick folklorist and historian. She was born in Gilead, Maine but her family moved to New Brunswick when she was three. She grew up on the Miramichi River and there she developed an interest in the local history, of which she wrote and broadcast extensively.

Commissioned by Lord Beaverbrook in 1947, she began to collect and record the songs of lumbermen and fishermen in the Miramichi region. Beaverbrook also provided financial assistance to allow her to restore The Manse in Newcastle, New Brunswick which became the local library.

Beaverbrook placed stringent constraints on her folklore collections. He stipulated that she collect only indigenous works, not those passed down from other sources. After she completed her assignment for Beaverbrook (published as Songs of Miramichi), she continued her research with more freedom, establishing a more encompassing philosophy: to her, folksong were songs "people sing from memory for their own and their friends' amusement, and are composed by the people themselves and passed on by word of mouth." Thus, whether old or new, they "show the basic cultural background of our country, something which is truly our own and which has sprung from the people. In recording them in all their simplicity we have preserved something of New Brunswick life and culture which has a value and beauty all its own."

For nearly twenty years (1947 to 1965) she presented these recordings in weekly broadcasts on CKMR radio in Newcastle.

Manny also presented items of historical interest in a weekly newspaper column called "Scenes from an Earlier Day." She founded the Miramichi Folksong Festival in 1957 and was the festival director from 1958 to 1969. The festival, which still continues, provided additional material for her work. In her work she was closely associated with Helen Creighton and Edward D. Ives who worked respectively in neighbouring Nova Scotia and Maine.

Publications and recordings
 Folksongs of the Miramichi: Lumber and River Songs from the Miramichi Folk Fest, Newcastle, New Brunswick (1962 Folkways album). 
 Songs of Miramichi'' (Fredericton 1968) with James Reginald Wilson

Honours
 Woman of the Century medal from the National Council of Jewish Women of Canada (1967)
 Mount Manny in New Brunswick's Historians' Range was named for her (1969)
 Honorary LL D (St Thomas College, Chatham) (1961)
 Honorary LL D (University of New Brunswick) (1961)

References
 Canadian Encyclopedia
 UNB Feature

Canadian folklorists
Women folklorists
1890 births
1970 deaths
People from Oxford County, Maine
People from Miramichi, New Brunswick
People from Northumberland County, New Brunswick